Gianluca Grignani (born 7 April 1972) is an Italian singer-songwriter and guitarist.

Biography
His musical career took off after meeting guitarist and producer Massimo Luca. After Grignani performed in the 1994 Festival di Sanremo, PolyGram persuaded him to release the acoustic ballad "La mia storia tra le dita".

In 1995, Grignani managed a breakthrough with the album Destinazione Paradiso, which sold two million copies within a year, and for which he was awarded the Telegatto.

"La mia storia tra le dita" became a number-one hit all over Iberoamerica and other countries in Europe.

On 4 December 2022, it was officially announced Gianluca Grignani participation in the Sanremo Music Festival 2023. "Quando ti manca il fiato" was later announced as his entry for the Sanremo Music Festival 2023.

Selected discography
 1995 – Destinazione Paradiso
 1995 – Destino Paraíso
 1996 – La Fabbrica di Plastica
 1998 – Campi di Popcorn
 1999 – Il Giorno Perfetto
 2000 – Sdraiato Su Una Nuvola
 2000 – Sentado En Una Nube
 2002 – Uguali e Diversi
 2003 – Succo di Vita
 2005 – Il Re del Niente
 2008 – Cammina Nel Sole
 2009 – Best of 
 2010 – Romantico Rock Show
 2011 – Natura Umana
 2013 – Essential
 2015 – A Volte Esagero
 2016 – Una Strada in Mezzo al Cielo

References

External links

 

1972 births
20th-century Italian composers
20th-century Italian male  singers
20th-century Italian male writers
21st-century composers
21st-century Italian male  singers
21st-century Italian male writers
Columbia Records artists
Italian male singer-songwriters
Italian pop singers
Living people
Mercury Records artists
People from Brianza
Pop guitarists
Singers from Milan
Spanish-language singers of Italy
20th-century guitarists
21st-century guitarists